Melones (Spanish for "Melons") is a former settlement in Calaveras County, California, now submerged beneath a reservoir named New Melones Lake. It lay at an elevation of 955 feet (291 m). Melones was founded on the site of a ferry operated from 1848 by John W. Robinson and Stephen Mead. The town initially took its name from the ferry.

History
The first post office opened in Robinsons Ferry in 1879, the name was changed to Robinson's in 1895, and to Melones in 1902.  The post office was closed in 1932, re-established in 1933 and closed for good in 1942.

In January 1923 Paramount Pictures chose Melones to construct a complete 1849 mining camp set there for the motion picture The Covered Wagon. The studio sent an authentic Sierra Railroad train built in 1897 to the location via the Angels Branch line to Melones.

The site was submerged under New Melones Lake when the New Melones Dam finished construction and began to fill in April 1, 1978.

References

External links
 Robinson's Ferry, Angels Camp, Cal., In E. F. Mueller Postcard Collection. "The Goodloe & Barden Drug Co."-on front. View of Robinson's Ferry on the Stanislaus River in Calaveras County. from calisphere.org California State Library, accessed September 22, 2018. 
 View of Robinson's Ferry landing at the Stanislaus River in Melones, ca.1930, Photographer: Pierce, C.C. (Charles C.), 1861-1946, from cdm15799.contentdm.oclc.org Digitally reproduced by the USC Digital Library; From the California Historical Society Collection at the University of Southern California, accessed September 22, 2018. Photograph of a view of Robinson's Ferry landing at the Stanislaus River in Melones, ca.1930. A wooden bridge extends from the dirt bank in the foreground to the other side of the riverbed. At the edge of the plank in center a staircase leads down to the ground through a wooden frame. At the bottom of the stairs there is a small trail of sunshine that is allowed through the shade that the tall trees on the right provide. A bend of the river can be seen on the left with banks of dirt and weeds. A hillside covered in trees and bushes can be seen in the background. "Ferry began operation in 1849 but is no longer used as the river has changed its course and a bridge has been built."
 Robinson's Ferry from hmdb.org THE HISTORICAL MARKER DATABASE, accessed September 22, 2018.    	

Former settlements in Calaveras County, California
Former populated places in California
Destroyed towns
Submerged settlements in the United States
1879 establishments in California